Taslim Samji is a Canadian interdisciplinary artist, writer and curator based in Burnaby, British Columbia.

Life and education 
Born in Tanzania, Taslim Samji immigrated to Canada at a young age and now lives and works in Burnaby, Canada.  She was educated at the University of British Columbia (Bachelor of Arts, Asian Studies), British Columbia Institute of Technology (marketing diploma) and Emily Carr University of Art and Design (Fine Arts Certificate program).

Exhibitions 
As an artist, Samji has participated in exhibitions, including Change – Contemporary Ismaili Muslim Art, held at the Surrey Art Gallery in 2014 and Kaleidoscope Fest in 2016.

As a curator, she is known for bridging cultural barriers among Ismaili Muslims and highlighting the work of women artists.  Samji curated Discovery: A Slice of Diversity at the Deer Lake Gallery (Burnaby Arts Council) in 2014, featuring the work of Canadian Ismaili Muslim artists with origins in East Africa. In November-December 2015, she curated Odyssey: Past Meets Present at the Roundhouse Community Arts and Recreation Centre in the Yaletown neighbourhood of Vancouver, in which 15 artists with geographically diverse backgrounds were invited to contribute artworks exploring how their past experiences influence their current work. The exhibition "Commonality" which was held at the Newton Cultural Centre in January 2016, illustrated the common ground among nine female Ismaili Muslim artists from East Africa, India and Pakistan.

Writing reference

References 

Living people
Artists from British Columbia
Canadian women artists
Canadian contemporary artists
Canadian Ismailis
Tanzanian emigrants to Canada
People from Burnaby
Canadian people of Gujarati descent
Year of birth missing (living people)